Guatemala competed at the World Games 2017 in Wroclaw, Poland from 24 July to 25 July Guatemala didn't win any medal in the multi-sport event.

Competitors

Speed skating 
Guatemala had qualified one athlete for the multi-sport event.

Soberanis Morenco in the women's speed skating events.

References 

Nations at the 2017 World Games
2017 in Guatemalan sport
2017